North Idaho College (NIC) is a public community college in Coeur d'Alene, Idaho.  It has an enrollment exceeding 6,000 and is situated at the north end of Lake Coeur d'Alene near downtown Coeur d'Alene, Idaho and Tubbs Hill, Coeur d'Alene, Idaho, at the east bank of the outflowing Spokane River. It is accredited by the Northwest Commission on Colleges and Universities but was placed on "show cause" status in early 2023 due to concerns about its board of trustees.

History
The school was established during the Great Depression in 1933 as "Coeur d'Alene Junior College," with classes held at City Hall. It moved to its present campus in 1939, at the site of the old Fort Sherman (1878–1900), and the name was changed to "North Idaho Junior College"; the present name came in 1971.

The college's board of trustees has engaged in actions that have drawn national attention on multiple occasions. In 2021, the board fired the college president without cause (later settling a lawsuit with him for nearly $500,000). Continued conflict among board members led to resignations of senior administrators at the college, the resignation of two trustees, the nonrenewal of some of the college's insurance policies, and a warning from the college's accreditor. In late 2022, the board suspended the college president, Nick Swayne, without explanation and hired a new attorney without an application or interview process; a few months later, the college was ordered by a judge to reinstate Swayne. These actions and concerns about their legality and the college's stability led Moody's Investor Service to downgrade the college's bond rating and warnings from the college's accreditor, the Northwest Commission on Colleges and Universities (NWCCU). In February 2023, NWCCU placed the college on "show cause" status, giving it one month to convince the accreditor that the college should remain accredited.

Academics
North Idaho College offers Associate's degrees, including transfer degrees and the Associate of Applied Science degree.

Notable alumni
Braian Angola (born 1994), Colombian basketball player who plays for Ironi Nes Ziona of the Israeli Basketball Premier League
Jason Bay, Major League Baseball All-Star, attended North Idaho College from 1997-1998.
Bryan Caraway, UFC bantamweight mixed martial artist (attended)
Barbara Ehardt, member of the Idaho House of Representatives and former college basketball coach
Kelvin Gastelum (attended), The Ultimate Fighter: Team Jones vs. Team Sonnen season 17 winner; current mixed martial artist in the UFC.
Rick Jore, former Montana State Representative, received his associate degree from the school in 1978.
Sarah Palin, former Alaska Governor and 2008 Vice Presidential candidate, attended North Idaho College during the Spring 1983 semester before transferring to the University of Idaho.
Steve Parker, NFL player
Trevor Prangley, All-American wrestler; mixed martial artist, formerly for King of the Cage, Strikeforce, Bellator, and the Ultimate Fighting Championship.
 Josh Thomson (attended), wrestler; retired mixed martial artist, former Strikeforce Lightweight Champion. Formerly in the Ultimate Fighting Championship and Bellator MMA.
Mike Whitehead (attended), three-time All-American wrestler; professional mixed martial artist.

Gallery

References

External links

Universities and colleges accredited by the Northwest Commission on Colleges and Universities
Buildings and structures in Coeur d'Alene, Idaho
Education in Kootenai County, Idaho
Community colleges in Idaho
NJCAA athletics